St. Lucia's flood (Sint-Luciavloed) was a storm tide that affected the Netherlands and Northern Germany on 13/14 December 1287 (OS), St. Lucia Day and the day after, killing approximately 50,000 to 80,000 people in one of the largest floods in recorded history.

This disaster was similar to the North Sea flood of 1953, when an intense European windstorm coinciding with a high tide caused a huge storm surge. The St. Lucia flood had a major influence on the subsequent history of the Netherlands.

Creation of Zuiderzee
The name Zuiderzee ("Southern Sea", from the Frisian perspective) dates from after this event, as the water had before been a freshwater lake that was only directly connected to the North Sea by the former river Vlie. The St. Lucia's flood removed the last of a series of natural sandy dunes and boulder clay barriers, after which the new, now salty Zuiderzee came into existence and grew rapidly, since the peatlands behind the former barriers were now mostly unprotected against erosion from the sea. The coming into existence of the Zuiderzee was the undoing of the powerful medieval trading city of Stavoren on the right bank of the now disappearing river Vlie, and the making of first the IJssel Hanse-cities of Kampen, Zwolle, Deventer, Zutphen, and Doesburg, and later the anti-Hanseatic city of Amsterdam, which began its rise from nothing almost immediately after the St. Lucia's flood.

Netherlands (West-Frisia and Frisia proper)
Much land was permanently flooded in what is now the Waddenzee and IJsselmeer. It especially affected the north and northwestern part of the Netherlands, particularly the current provinces of North Holland and Friesland. 

The island of Griend in the current Waddenzee saw serious destruction, with only ten houses left standing. After the flood, Harlingen, about 25 kilometres southeast of Griend and formerly landlocked, came into existence as the new seaport of Friesland, a role it kept for seven centuries.

The only part of the current northwestern Netherlands, apart from the western Dunes area (the old Dutch heartland) and the Frisian Islands that escaped annihilation was West-Friesland, since this area was already protected by a ringdike that mostly held and where  not, could be repaired after the floods receded. Shortly after the St. Lucia Day disaster, the West-Frisia, now separated from the rest of Friesland by a strait of around 15 kilometres at its narrowest, was annexed by the county of Holland, expanding this county northwards. The flood also brought the Friso-Hollandic Wars, which had lasted around 200 years, to an end. Shortly after this annexation, the West-Frisian cities of Hoorn and Enkhuizen began a rise to prominence that would last until the 17th century.

In Germany (mostly East Frisia)
The Chronicles speak of 50,000 killed and total destruction. Many villages disappeared forever. In the current district of East-Frisia alone thirty villages disappeared in the North Sea. Also a first stage of the Dollart came into existence. Because of the large loss of land and the relative insecurity of living in the now far more unprotected peatlands, since natural barriers had been removed by the flood, many survivors gave up their ways of living in the fertile peatlands and moved to the Geest.

In England
Although not known by the name of St. Lucia, the same storm also had devastating effects on the other side of the North Sea in England. It killed hundreds of people in England, e.g. in the village of Hickling, Norfolk, where 180 died and the water rose a foot above the high altar in the Priory Church.

The storm is one of two in 1287 sometimes referred to as a "Great Storm". The other was the South England flood of February 1287. Together with a surge in January 1286, they seem to have prompted the decline of one of England's then leading ports, Dunwich in Suffolk.

See also
Floods in the Netherlands

References 
 Gevaar van water, water in gevaar uit 2001 
 Buisman, Jan, Duizend jaar weer, wind en water in de Lage Landen (Deel 1: tot 1300),

Notes 

Floods in the Netherlands
Floods in Germany
Floods in England
History of Lower Saxony
History of Schleswig-Holstein
13th-century floods
13th century in the Netherlands
Storm tides of the North Sea 
1287 in Europe
1287 in England
Disasters in Suffolk
Medieval weather events
1280s in the Holy Roman Empire